Nadodi Raja is a 1982 Indian Tamil-language film, directed by S. M. Ummar, starring Rajeev and Mucherla Aruna. The film was released on 15 October 1982.

Plot

Cast 
 Rajeev
 Mucherla Aruna
 Amrad Kumar
 Sangili Murugan
 Sathyaraj
 Thiagarajan
 Y. G. Mahendran
 Jayamalini
 Vennira Aadai Nirmala
 Y. Vijaya

Soundtrack 
The music was composed by Shankar–Ganesh.

References

External links 
 

1980s Tamil-language films
1982 films
Films scored by Shankar–Ganesh